Namakoro Diallo (born 29 March 1996) is a French professional footballer who plays as a left-back for Championnat National 2 club Boulogne.

Club career
Diallo first appeared for the reserve team in 2014, and signed his first professional contract with his youth club Rennes. He made his professional debut for Rennes in a 7–0 Coupe de la Ligue loss to Monaco on 14 December 2016. On 24 January 2018, Diallo fractured his tibia which required surgery.

In August 2019, Rennes loaned Diallo to Championnat National side Avranches until the end of the 2019–20 season.

International career
Diallo was born in France and is of Malian descent. Diallo made one appearance for the France U20s in a 2–0 friendly win over the Netherlands U20s on 7 September 2015.

References

External links
 
 
 
 
 Stade Rennais Profile

1996 births
French sportspeople of Malian descent
Black French sportspeople
Sportspeople from Saint-Denis, Seine-Saint-Denis
Living people
French footballers
France youth international footballers
Association football fullbacks
Stade Rennais F.C. players
US Avranches players
SO Romorantin players
US Boulogne players
Championnat National players
Championnat National 2 players
Championnat National 3 players
Footballers from Seine-Saint-Denis